Francis Mitchell Cayou (March 7, 1878 – May 7, 1948) an American football player and coach of football, basketball, and baseball.  He served as the head football coach at Wabash College from 1904 to 1907 and at Washington University in St. Louis from 1908 to 1912, compiling a career college football coaching record of 38–30–4. He also coached basketball at Washington University from 1908 to 1910 and again from 1911 to 1913, tallying a mark of 25–23.  Cayou was a member of the Omaha tribe and attended the Carlisle Indian Industrial School and then Dickinson College. He played football as a quarterback for the Carlisle Indians. After the close of Carlisle's 1898 season, Cayou and Eddie Rogers played for Dickinson College, where they were enrolled in law school, in their Thanksgiving Day loss versus Penn State. He also played quarterback and running back for Illinois Fighting Illini and was noted for his speed that was displayed on a 95-yard kickoff return versus Purdue. Cayou also set the Illinois Fighting Illini track record in the 220-yard dash, clocking in at 22 3/5 sec, before bettering it with a 22 sec run. Cayou served as captain of the Illinois track team in 1902 when elected captain, O.C. Bell, fell ill.

Cayou, known as Standing Elk, also served as chief of the Omaha tribe.

Coaching career
Cayou was the 16th head football coach at Wabash College, serving from 1904 to 1907, and compiling a record of 20–13–1. In 1905, Cayou led Wabash to one of its most impressive upsets when it defeated Notre Dame, 5–0, at South Bend. It proved to be the Fighting Irish's only home-field loss in 125 games between 1899 and 1928. 

On January 6, 1918, Cayou became the athletic director of the Illinois Athletic Club, where he served until 1921. Cayou also served as the athletic director of the Naval Station Great Lakes in Illinois from 1921 to 1923.

Head coaching record

Football

References

External links
 

1878 births
1948 deaths
American football quarterbacks
Basketball coaches from Nebraska
Carlisle Indians football players
Wabash Little Giants baseball coaches
Wabash Little Giants football coaches
Washington University Bears football coaches
Washington University Bears men's basketball coaches
Omaha (Native American) people
Players of American football from Nebraska
Native American players of American football